The 2011 Tour de Corse, was the third round of the 2011 Intercontinental Rally Challenge (IRC) season. The fourteen stage asphalt rally took place on the island of Corsica between 12–14 May 2011.

Introduction
The rally was based in the capital, Ajaccio, with day one consisting of two runs through the  Le Fangu stage. A total of 48 cars contested the event, with Bryan Bouffier seeded number one.

Results
Thierry Neuville took his first IRC victory and became the season's third different winner after controlling the event for almost the entire rally, only being headed in one stage by Bryan Bouffier. Jan Kopecký finished second for the second consecutive event while Freddy Loix took the championship lead with third place.

Overall

Special stages

References

External links 
 The official website for the rally
 The official website of the Intercontinental Rally Challenge

Corsica
Tour de Corse
Corse